Unam station is a railway station in Unjŏn County, North P'yŏngan Province, North Korea. It is on located on the P'yŏngŭi Line of the Korean State Railway.

History
Originally opened as Unjŏn station, it received its current name in July 1945.

References

Railway stations in North Korea
Buildings and structures in North Pyongan Province